Amédée Ronzel (8 January 1909 – 13 April 1973) was a French bobsledder. Competing in two Winter Olympics, he earned his best finish of ninth in the four-man event at St. Moritz in 1948. In 1936 he failed to finish in the four-man event.

References

1936 bobsleigh four-man results
1936 Olympic Winter Games official report. - p. 416.
1948 bobsleigh four-man results
Amédée Ronzel's profile at Sports Reference.com

1909 births
1973 deaths
French male bobsledders
Olympic bobsledders of France
Bobsledders at the 1936 Winter Olympics
Bobsledders at the 1948 Winter Olympics